Keyes may refer to:

 Keyes (surname), including a list of people with the name

Places
Keyes, California
Keyes, Oklahoma

Characters
 Captain Jacob Keyes and his daughter Miranda, fictional characters from the video game Halo
 Carlito Keyes, fictional character
 Sammy Keyes, fictional character

See also
 Cays, often pronounced "keys"
 Key (disambiguation)